Geissorhiza is a genus with 103 species described to date of deciduous perennial flowering plants in the family Iridaceae first described as a genus in 1803. The entire genus is endemic to Cape Province of western South Africa. The genus name is derived from the Greek words geisson, meaning "tile", and rhizon, meaning "root".

Here are some of them:

 Geissorhiza aspera
 Geissorhiza brehmii
 Geissorhiza confusa
 Geissorhiza corrugata
 Geissorhiza darlingensis
 Geissorhiza exscapa
 Geissorhiza eurystigma
 Geissorhiza geminata
 Geissorhiza hesperanthoides
 Geissorhiza heterostyla
 Geissorhiza imbricata
 Geissorhiza inaequalis
 Geissorhiza inflexa
 Geissorhiza leopoldtii
 Geissorhiza mathewsii
 Geissorhiza melanthera
 Geissorhiza monanthos
 Geissorhiza ornithogaloides
 Geissorhiza ovata 
 Geissorhiza purpureolutea
 Geissorhiza radians
 Geissorhiza schinzii
 Geissorhiza splendidissima
 Geissorhiza tulbaghensis

References

 
Iridaceae genera
Endemic flora of South Africa